Jacob DeRosier (1880 – February 25, 1913) was a Canadian professional motorcycle racer. He was one of the first factory-backed motorcycle racers of the early 20th Century. He rode for Indian and then Excelsior, and was the fastest rider in the United States in the early 1900s.

Early years 
Jake DeRosier was born in Quebec, Canada in 1880 and came to the United States at the age of four. DeRosier started his career in bicycle racing as a teenager.  French auto racing driver Henri Fournier introduced DeRosier to motorcycles in 1898 while visiting the United States.  Motorcycles like Fournier's were used to pace bicycle racers, drafting them in order to attain higher speeds. After acquiring skills with the motorbike, DeRosier was among the first to enter the new sport of motorcycle racing in 1901.

DeRosier earned a strong reputation as a daring rider not only by winning races, but bouncing back from numerous injuries. His diminutive physique, once described as, "a slight, slender fellow that a strong Christmas breath might blow over," was actually an advantage. His light weight helped the primitive, low power motors of the time achieve greater speed.

Factory rider for Indian 
After winning top rider honors at the Federation of American Motorcyclists national championship in 1908 at Paterson, New Jersey, he attracted the attention of the Indian  Company. He was signed to a contract and began racing every week, amassing hundreds of victories over time. Like the bicycles, the motorcycles raced on wooden velodromes,  saucer shaped board track speedways. This was dangerous as riders would crashed into the boards, breaking bones and driving splinters deep under their skin.

DeRosier's reputation grew and by the time he entered the first motorized competition at the new Indianapolis Motor Speedway for their August 1909 Federation of American Motorcyclists (FAM) meet, newspapers called him "world champion." An injury on the Speedway's unpaved gravel surface nearly proved deadly. Severely injured in a match race with a top California rider named Ed Lingenfelder, DeRosier hemorrhaged for a week. Against doctors's advice, DeRosier entered a Lowell, New Jersey race just a few weeks later on September 10, 1909.

On February 7, 1911 he ran 90 consecutive miles to claim every FAM speed record from 1 to 100 miles.

In June 1911 DeRosier tackled the 1911 Isle of Man TT race. While he set fast time in practice, he crashed out of competition after leading early. Redeeming himself, he defeated English Champion Charles Collier at the famous Brooklands oval speedway in a match race just a few days later.

He was riding his well known 7 hp Indian racer "No 21". (The MotorCycle August 10, 1911).

Move to Excelsior 
After DeRosier returned from England in 1911, he had an argument with company founder George Hendee and was fired from Indian. He was immediately hired by Excelsior Motorcycles.

Injuries and death 
While Jake DeRosier was widely respected for his skills at the wheel of a motorcycle, he spent much of his career injured in spectacular accidents. He broke his left leg three times, his left forearm once, had one rib removed, fractured his skull, severed an artery and suffered serious leg burns from flaming engines.

He suffered the most serious injuries of his career on March 12, 1912. Injuries to his left leg and thigh were extensive. He endured three corrective surgeries, losing his life to complications from the final operation on February 25, 1913.

Notes

References

Brooklands, William Boddy, William Boddy, 1957 & 2001, page 13.

1880 births
1913 deaths
Canadian motorcycle racers
American motorcycle racers
Isle of Man TT riders